Dalea  is a genus of flowering plants in the legume family, Fabaceae. Members of the genus are commonly known as prairie clover or indigo bush. Its name honors English apothecary Samuel Dale (1659–1739). They are native to the Western hemisphere, where they are distributed from Canada to Argentina. Nearly half of the known species are endemic to Mexico. Two species of Dalea (Dalea ornata and Dalea searlsiae) have been considered for rangeland restoration.

Species
Dalea comprises the following species:

 Dalea abietifolia (Rydb.) Bullock
 Dalea acracarpica Barneby

 Dalea adenopoda (Rydb.) Isely—Tampa prairie clover
 Dalea aenigma Barneby

 Dalea albiflora A. Gray—whiteflower prairie clover

 Dalea ananassa Barneby

 Dalea antana J.F. Macbr.

 Dalea arenicola (Wemple) B.L. Turner

 Dalea aurea C. Fraser—golden prairie clover
 Dalea austrotexana B.L.Turner
 Dalea ayavacensis Kunth
 var. ayavacensis Kunth
 var. killipii (J.F.Macbr.) Barneby
 Dalea azurea (Phil.) Reiche
 Dalea bacchantum Barneby

 Dalea bartonii Barneby—Warnock's prairie clover, Cox's dalea

 Dalea bicolor Willd.—silver prairie clover
 var. argyrea (A.Gray) Barneby
 var. bicolor Willd.
 var. canescens (M.Martens & Galeotti) Barneby
 var. naviculifolia (Hemsl.) Barneby
 var. orcuttiana Barneby

 Dalea boliviana Britton
 Dalea boraginea Barneby
 Dalea botterii (Rydb.) Barneby
 Dalea brachystachya A. Gray—Fort Bowie prairie clover
 Dalea brandegei (Rose) Bullock
 Dalea caeciliae Harms

 Dalea cahaba J.R.Allison—Cahaba prairie clover

 Dalea candida Willd.—white prairie clover, white tassel-flower
 var. candida Willd.
 var. oligophylla (Torr.) Shinners

 Dalea capitata S. Watson
 var. capitata S. Watson
 var. quinqueflora (Brandegee) Barneby

 Dalea carnea (Michx.) Poir.—whitetassels
 var. albida (Torr. & A. Gray) Barneby
 var. carnea (Michx.) Poir.

 Dalea carthagenensis (Jacq.) J.F. Macbr.—Cartagena prairie clover
 var. barbata (Oerst.) Barneby
 var. brevis (J.F.Macbr.) Barneby
 var. capitulata (Rydb.) Barneby
 var. carthagenensis (Jacq.) J.F. Macbr.
 var. floridana (Rydb.) Barneby
 var. pilocarpa (Rusby) Barneby
 var. portoricana Barneby
 var. trichocalyx (Ulbr.) Barneby

 Dalea ceciliana—Cecilia's prairie clover
 Dalea choanosema Barneby
 Dalea chrysophylla Barneby

 Dalea cinnamomea Barneby

 Dalea cliffortiana Willd.
 Dalea coerulea (L. f.) Schinz & Thell.
 var. coerulea (L. f.) Schinz & Thell.
 var. longispicata (Ulbr.) Barneby

 Dalea compacta Spreng.—compact prairie clover
 var. compacta Spreng.
 var. pubescens (A.Gray) Barneby
 Dalea confusa (Rydb.) Barneby
 Dalea cora Barneby

 Dalea crassifolia Hemsl.

 Dalea cuatrecasasii Barneby
 Dalea cuniculo-caudata Paul G. Wilson

 Dalea cyanea Greene
 Dalea cylindrica Hook.
 var. cylindrica Hook.
 var. haenkeana Barneby
 var. nova (Ulbr.) Barneby
 var. sulfurea (Ulbr.) Barneby
 Dalea cylindriceps Barneby—Andean prairie clover

 Dalea daucosma Barneby

 Dalea dipsacea Barneby
 Dalea dispar C.V. Morton

 Dalea dorycnoides DC.

 Dalea elata Hook. & Arn.
 Dalea elegans Hook. & Arn.
 var. elegans Hook. & Arn.
 var. onobrychioides (Griseb.) Barneby

 Dalea emarginata (Torr. & A. Gray) Shinners—wedgeleaf prairie clover

 Dalea enneandra C. Fraser—nineanther prairie clover

 Dalea eriophylla S. Watson

 Dalea erythrorhiza Greenm.
 Dalea escobilla Barneby

 Dalea exigua Barneby—Chihuahuan prairie clover
 Dalea exilis DC.
 Dalea exserta (Rydb.) Gentry—Mexican prairie clover

 Dalea feayi (Chapman) Barneby—Feay's prairie clover
 Dalea fieldii (J.F. Macbr.) J.F. Macbr.
 Dalea filiciformis Robinson & Greenm.
 Dalea filiformis A. Gray—Sonoran prairie clover

 Dalea flavescens (S. Watson) S.L. Welsh—Canyonlands prairie clover
 Dalea foliolosa (Aiton) Barneby
 var. citrina (Rydb.) Barneby
 var. foliolosa (Aiton) Barneby
 Dalea foliosa (A. Gray) Barneby—leafy prairie clover
 Dalea formosa Torr.—featherplume

 Dalea frutescens A. Gray—black prairie clover, black dalea

 Dalea galbina (J.F. Macbr.) J.F. Macbr.
 Dalea gattingeri (A. Heller) Barneby—purpletassels

 Dalea glumacea Barneby

 Dalea grayi (Vail) L.O. Williams—Gray's prairie clover
 Dalea greggii A. Gray—Gregg's prairie clover

 Dalea gypsophila Barneby
 Dalea hallii A. Gray
 Dalea hegewischiana Steud.

 Dalea hemsleyana (Rose) Bullock

 Dalea hintonii Sandwith

 Dalea hospes (Rose) Bullock
 Dalea humifusa Benth.
 Dalea humilis G. Don

 Dalea illustris Barneby

 Dalea insignis Hemsl.

 Dalea isidorii Barneby
 Dalea jamesii (Torr.) Torr. & A. Gray—James' prairie clover
 Dalea jamesonii (J.F. Macbr.) J.F. Macbr.

 Dalea juncea (Rydb.) Wiggins

 Dalea kuntzei Kuntze

 Dalea lachnostachys A. Gray—glandleaf prairie clover

 Dalea lamprostachya Barneby
 Dalea lanata Spreng.—woolly prairie clover, woolly dalea
 var. lanata Spreng.
 var. terminalis (M.E.Jones) Barneby
 Dalea laniceps Barneby—woollyhead prairie clover

 Dalea lasiathera A. Gray—purple dalea

 Dalea leporina (Aiton) Bullock—foxtail prairie clover, hare's foot dalea
 Dalea leptostachya DC.
 Dalea leucosericea (Rydb.) Standl. & Steyerm.
 Dalea leucostachya A. Gray
 var. eysenhardtioides (Hemsl.) Barneby
 var. leucostachya A. Gray

 Dalea luisana S. Watson
 Dalea lumholtzii Robinson & Fernald—Lumholtz's prairie clover
 Dalea lutea (Cav.) Willd.
 var. gigantea (Rydb.) Barneby
 var. lutea (Cav.) Willd.

 Dalea macrotropis S. Schauer

 Dalea mcvaughii Barneby

 Dalea melantha S. Schauer
 Dalea mexiae Barneby

 Dalea minutifolia (Rydb.) Harms
 Dalea mixteca Barneby
 Dalea mollis Benth.—hairy prairie clover
 Dalea mollissima (Rydb.) Munz—soft prairie clover
 Dalea moquehuana J.F. Macbr.
 Dalea mucronata DC.
 Dalea multiflora (Nutt.) Shinners—roundhead prairie clover

 Dalea myriadenia Ulbr.
 Dalea nana A. Gray—dwarf prairie clover
 var. carnescens (Rydb.) Kearney & Peebles
 var. nana A. Gray

 Dalea nelsonii Rydb.
 Dalea nemaphyllidia Barneby
 Dalea neomexicana (A. Gray) Cory—downy prairie clover, New Mexico dalea
 var. longipila (Rydb.) Barneby
 var. neomexicana (A. Gray) Cory

 Dalea nobilis Barneby

 Dalea obovata (Torr. & A. Gray) Shinners
 Dalea obovatifolia Ortega
 var. obovatifolia Ortega
 var. uncifera (Schltdl. & Cham.) Barneby
 Dalea obreniformis (Rydb.) Barneby

 Dalea onobrychis DC.

 Dalea ornata (Hook.) Eaton & Wright—Blue Mountain prairie clover, handsome prairie clover

 Dalea parrasana Brandegee

 Dalea pazensis Rusby
 Dalea pectinata Kunth

 Dalea pennellii (J.F. Macbr.) J.F. Macbr.

 Dalea phleoides (Torr. & A. Gray) Shinners—slimspike prairie clover
 var. microphylla (Torr. & A.Gray) Barneby
 var. phleoides (Torr. & A. Gray) Shinners

 Dalea pinetorum Gentry
 Dalea pinnata (J.F. Gmel.) Barneby—summer farewell
 Dalea piptostegia Barneby
 Dalea plantaginoides Barneby

 Dalea pogonathera A. Gray—bearded prairie clover
 var. pogonathera A. Gray
 var. walkerae (Tharp & F. A. Barkley) B. L. Turner

 Dalea polygonoides A. Gray—sixweeks prairie clover

 Dalea polystachya (Sessé & Moc.) Barneby
 Dalea pringlei A. Gray—Pringle's prairie clover

 Dalea prostrata Ortega

 Dalea pseudocorymbosa A.E.Estrada & Villarreal

 Dalea pulchella G. Don

 Dalea pulchra Gentry—Santa Catalina prairie clover

 Dalea purpurea Vent.—purple prairie clover, violet dalea
 Dalea purpusii Brandegee

 Dalea quercetorum Standl. & L.O. Williams

 Dalea radicans S. Watson

 Dalea reclinata (Cav.) Willd.

 Dalea reverchonii (S. Watson) Shinners
 Dalea revoluta S. Watson

 Dalea rubrolutea Barneby
 Dalea rupertii A.E. Estrada, Villarreal & M. González

 Dalea rzedowskii Barneby
 Dalea sabinalis (S. Watson) Shinners—sabinal prairie clover

 Dalea saffordii (Rose) Bullock

 Dalea scandens (Mill.) R.T. Clausen—low prairie clover
 var. occidentalis (Rydb.) Barneby
 var. paucifolia (J.M.Coult.) Barneby
 var. scandens (Mill.) R.T. Clausen
 var. vulneraria (Oerst.) Barneby
 Dalea scariosa S. Watson—Albuquerque prairie clover

 Dalea schiblii Medina & M. Sousa

 Dalea searlsiae (A. Gray) Barneby—Searls' prairie clover

 Dalea sericea Lag.
 Dalea sericocalyx (Rydb.) L. Riley

 Dalea similis Hemsl.
 Dalea simulatrix Barneby
 Dalea smithii (J.F. Macbr.) J.F. Macbr.
 Dalea sousae Barneby

 Dalea strobilacea Barneby

 Dalea tapacariensis Kuntze

 Dalea tentaculoides Gentry—Gentry's indigobush
 Dalea tenuicaulis Hook. f.
 Dalea tenuifolia (A. Gray) Shinners—slimleaf prairie clover, bigtop dalea
 Dalea tenuis (J.M. Coult.) Shinners—pinkglobe prairie clover

 Dalea thouinii Schrank

 Dalea tinctoria Brandegee
 Dalea tolteca Barneby
 Dalea tomentosa (Cav.) Willd.
 var. mota Barneby
 var. psoraleoides (Moric.) Barneby
 var. tomentosa (Cav.) Willd.
 Dalea transiens Barneby

 Dalea tridactylites Barneby
 Dalea trifoliata Zucc.

 Dalea trochilina Brandegee

 Dalea uniflora (Barneby) G.L. Nesom

 Dalea urceolata Greene—pineforest prairie clover
 var. lucida (Rydb.) Barneby
 var. urceolata Greene

 Dalea verna Barneby

 Dalea versicolor Zucc.—oakwoods prairie clover
 subsp. argyrostachya (Hook. & Arn.) Barneby
 subsp. glabrescens (Rydb.) Barneby
 subsp. sessilis (A. Gray) Barneby
 subsp. versicolor Zucc.

 Dalea villosa (Nutt.) Spreng.—silky prairie clover
 var. grisea (Torr. & A.Gray) Barneby
 var. villosa (Nutt.) Spreng.

 Dalea virgata Lag.
 Dalea viridiflora S. Watson

 Dalea weberbaueri Ulbr.
 var. sericophylla (Ulbr.) Barneby
 var. weberbaueri Ulbr.

 Dalea wigginsii Barneby

 Dalea wrightii A. Gray—Wright's prairie clover
 Dalea zimapanica S. Schauer

Species names with uncertain taxonomic status
The status of the following species is unresolved:

 Dalea acutiflora Steud.
 Dalea analiliana Spellenb.
 Dalea austrotexana B.L.Turner
 Dalea barbata (Oerst.) Aymard
 Dalea ceciliana B.L.Turner
 Dalea diversicolor Rydb.
 Dalea enneandra Nutt.
 Dalea filiciformis B.L. Rob. & Greenm.
 Dalea flavescens (S. Watson) S.L. Welsh ex Barneby
 Dalea flavorosea Moc. & Sessé ex DC.
 Dalea goldmani (Rose) L.Riley
 Dalea gymnocodon Barneby
 Dalea holwayi Rose
 Dalea humboldtiana Velarde
 Dalea hypoglottidea DC.
 Dalea lachnantha S.Schauer
 Dalea lachnostachya A.Gray
 Dalea lagopoda St.-Lag.
 Dalea lateripes Moc. & Sessé ex DC.
 Dalea longipes Moc. & Sessé ex DC.
 Dalea lumholtzii B.L. Rob. & Fernald
 Dalea lutescens Cervantes ex G. Don
 Dalea megalostachya (Rose) Wiggins
 Dalea melilotoides Moc. & Sessé ex DC.
 Dalea moricandi D. Dietr.
 Dalea mota Gentry
 Dalea multifoliata Phil.f.
 Dalea nelsonii (Rydb.) Barneby
 Dalea pendulina Moc. & Sessé ex DC.
 Dalea polyadenia F. Heller
 Dalea scopa Barneby
 Dalea seleriana Harms
 Dalea unguicularis Moc. & Sessé ex DC.
 Dalea unifoliolata C.B.Rob. & Greenm.
 Dalea vernica (Rose) Greenm.
 Dalea watsonii (Rose) Gentry
 Dalea whitingi Kearney & Peebles

Gallery

References

External links
 
 
 Dalea. USDA PLANTS.

 
Fabaceae genera